Frederick Everard Zeuner, FZS (8 March 1905 – 5 November 1963) was a German palaeontologist and geological archaeologist who was a contemporary of Gordon Childe at the Institute of Archaeology of the University of London. Zeuner proposed a detailed scheme of correlation and dating of European climatic and prehistoric cultural events on the basis of Milankovitch cycles.

Zeuner was born in Berlin, Germany, and received his Ph.D. from the University of Breslau in 1927.  After working as a Privatdozent at the University of Breslau from 1927-1930 and a lecturer in geology at the University of Freiburg from 1931-34 he emigrated to England where he worked as a research associate at the British Museum (Natural History) from 1934-36.  Zeuner was lecturer in geochronology at the University of London's  Institute of Archaeology from 1936 to 1945 and received his D. Sc. from the university in 1942.  From 1946 to 1963 he was professor and head of environmental archaeology at the University of London's Institute of Archaeology, where postgraduate students included Andrée Rosenfeld.  He was a member of the Geologische Vereinigung in Germany and was admitted to the German Academy of Natural Scientists Leopoldina (1952).  He was also a member of the Royal Anthropological Institute of Great Britain and Ireland.

Selected publications
Dating the Past: An Introduction to Geochronology. London: Methuen, 1946.
Prehistory in India: Four Broadcast Talks on Early Man. India: Deccan College Postgraduate and Research Institute, 1951.
The Pleistocene Period: Its Climate, Chronology, and Faunal Successions. Hutchinson Scientific & Technical, 1959.
"Fossil insects from the Lower Lias of Charmouth, Dorset" in Bulletin of the British Museum (Natural History), Geology, 7:155-171 [M. Clapham/J. Karr/M. Clapham]
A history of domesticated animals. New York: Harper & Row, 1963.

References

Archaeologists from Berlin
Fellows of the Zoological Society of London
Academics of the UCL Institute of Archaeology
1905 births
1963 deaths
German expatriates in the United Kingdom